Rex Gildo (formerly Alexander Gildo, born Ludwig Franz Hirtreiter; 2 July 1936 – 26 October 1999) was a German singer of Schlager ballads who reached the height of his popularity in the 1960s and 1970s, selling over 25 million records and starring in film and television roles.

Early life

Gildo was born Ludwig Franz Hirtreiter in Straubing, Bavaria; in the mid-1950s he adopted the stage name Alexander Gildo, later shortening it to Rex Gildo. He claimed for many years to have been a member of the Regensburger Domspatzen choir before attending acting school; however, a documentary on German television a decade after his death in 2009 revealed that in fact he had worked in a decorating apprenticeship before he met Fred Miekley, who would become his manager/longtime companion.

Career
Gildo's first performance was with the Munich Kammerspiele theatre group in 1956, but he quickly moved into television and film, as well as performing as a singer, duetting with Danish singer Gitte Haenning as "Gitte & Rex". His most popular songs, such as Speedy Gonzales (1962), Goodbye Susanna (1965) and Fiesta Mexicana (1972), were sung during the 1960s and 1970s in Germany. His music and films sold well there but less so abroad. He also starred in his own television program, Gestatten – Rex Gildo.

During the 1980s and 1990s, Gildo's popularity decreased. His appearances were mainly at folk festivals, shopping centres and other similar venues; he was also reported to have problems with alcoholism. His final performance, on the day of his suicide attempt, was in front of more than 3000 people at a furniture shop outside Frankfurt.

Personal life and death
In 1974, Gildo married his cousin Marion Ohlsen in a lavender marriage. The couple had no children and separated in 1990. After his death, it was reported that he was gay and had a relationship with Dave Klingeberg, his secretary, with whom he lived for 7 years.

Gildo died in 1999, aged 63, having spent three days in an artificially-induced coma after attempting suicide by jumping from the window of his apartment building. He was said to have been suffering from psychological problems.

Discography

Das Ende der Liebe (Tell Laura I love You)/Minnetonka Mädi (1959)
Sieben Wochen nach Bombay (1960)
Yes My Darling (1960), together with Conny Froboess
Speedy Gonzales (1962)
Zwei blaue Vergißmeinnicht (1963)
Vom Stadtpark die Laternen (1963), together with Gitte Haenning
Zwei auf einer Bank (1964), together with Gitte Haenning
Jetzt dreht die Welt sich nur um dich (1964), together with Gitte Haenning
Hokuspokus (1964), together with Gitte Haenning
Dein Glück ist mein Glück (1965), together with Gitte Haenning
Goodbye Susanna (1965)
Augen wie zwei Sterne (1966)
Der Mond hat seine Schuldigkeit getan (1967)
Komm, Laß Uns Tanzen (1967)
Schlager-Rendezvous Mit Rex Gildo (1967)
Ein Ring aus Gold (1968)
Rex Gildo's Disco Club With Jo Ment's Happy Sound – 28 Party Hits For Dancing  (1968)
Dondolo (1969)
Rex (1969)
Memories (1971)
Fiesta Mexicana (1972)
Der Sommer ist vorbei (1973)

Marie der letzte Tanz (1974)
Der letzte Sirtaki (1975)
Küsse von dir (1976, German version of Save Your Kisses for Me)
Love Is in the Air (1978)
Sally komm wieder (1978)
Saragossa (1979)
Holly ho Havanna (1979)
La Bandita (1980)
Wenn ich je deine Liebe verlier (1981)
Und sie hieß Julie (1983)
Und plötzlich ist es wieder da (1983)
Dir fehlt Liebe (1984)
Rendezvous auf spanisch (1984)
Mamma mia (1985)
Du ich lieb Dich (1985)
Was ist schon eine Nacht (1986)
Mexicanische Nacht (1989)
Margarita (1991)

Selected filmography
Immer wenn der Tag beginnt (1957), as Max Clement
Schmutziger Engel (1958), as Peter Utesch
 (1958), as Gerd Weidner
 Hula-Hopp, Conny (1959), as Billy Newman
 (1959), as Rex
My Niece Doesn't Do That (1960), as Robert
Am Sonntag will mein Süßer mit mir segeln gehn (1961), as Tommy
Dance with Me Into the Morning (1962), as Stefan Breuer
 Café Oriental (1962), as Himself
 Don't Fool with Me (1963), as Billie Bill
 (1963), as Rolf
Apartmentzauber (1963), as Karl Fischer
 The World Revolves Around You (1964), as Martin Fischer
 (1965), as Rick Tanner
What Is the Matter with Willi? (1970), as Frankie Kuhländer
 (1973), as Martin Klamm
As himself
Hit Parade 1960 (1960)
Marina (1960)
 (1960)
 (1961)
Café Oriental (1962)
Our Crazy Nieces (1963)
Maskenball bei Scotland Yard (1963)
 (1968)

References

External links
 
 

1936 births
20th-century German male singers
German male television actors
German male film actors
People from Straubing
Schlager musicians
Suicides by jumping in Germany
Burials at the Ostfriedhof (Munich)
20th-century German male actors
German gay musicians
German LGBT singers
Gay singers
1999 suicides
1999 deaths
20th-century German LGBT people